Collagen alpha-2(IV) chain is a protein that in humans is encoded by the COL4A2 gene.

This gene encodes one of the six subunits of type IV collagen, the major structural component of basement membranes. The C-terminal portion of the protein, known as canstatin, is an inhibitor of angiogenesis and tumor growth. Like the other members of the type IV collagen gene family, this gene is organized in a head-to-head conformation with another type IV collagen gene so that each gene pair shares a common promoter.

References

Further reading

Collagens